Sphecomyia is a genus of hoverfly in the family Syrphidae. There are about 16 described species in Sphecomyia.

Species
Sphecomyia aino (Stackelberg, 1955)
Sphecomyia brevicornis Osten Sacken, 1877
Sphecomyia columbiana Vockeroth, 1965
Sphecomyia cryptica Moran, 2019
Sphecomyia dyari Shannon, 1925
Sphecomyia hoguei Moran, 2019
Sphecomyia interrupta Moran, 2019
Sphecomyia metallica (Bigot, 1882)
Sphecomyia oraria Moran, 2019
Sphecomyia pattonii Williston, 1882
Sphecomyia pseudosphecomima Moran, 2019
Sphecomyia sexfasciata Moran, 2019
Sphecomyia tsherepanovi (Violovich, 1974)
Sphecomyia vespiformis (Gorski, 1852)
Sphecomyia vittata (Wiedemann, 1830)
Sphecomyia weismani Moran, 2019

References

Eristalinae
Diptera of North America
Diptera of Asia
Taxa named by Pierre André Latreille
Hoverfly genera